Rail and Titsworth Canal Warehouse, also known as DeCilio's, is a historic canal warehouse building located at Belfast in Allegany County, New York.  It is the oldest surviving warehouse from along the route of the Genesee Valley Canal, later Genesee Valley Canal Railroad.  It was built about 1853 in the Greek Revival style. Built originally as a warehouse, over the years the structure has been used as a hotel, brothel, barn, and storehouse.

It was listed on the National Register of Historic Places in 2000.

References

Commercial buildings on the National Register of Historic Places in New York (state)
Greek Revival architecture in New York (state)
Commercial buildings completed in 1853
Buildings and structures in Allegany County, New York
Railway hotels in the United States
National Register of Historic Places in Allegany County, New York